Quair may refer to:
 The Scots form of Paper quire used to describe a literary work, as in The Kingis Quair 
 Quair Water, a tributary of the River Tweed